Suncoast Motion Picture Company was an American chain of retail stores specializing in new and used physical media, primarily CDs, DVDs, Blu-rays, and vinyl records, as well as collectibles.

Suncoast was a subsidiary of Sunrise Records, and its stores were largely stocked the same as their FYE stores.

History
The first Suncoast store opened in Roseville, Minnesota, in 1986 as Paramount Pictures, changing their name to Suncoast Motion Picture Company in 1988.

In 1999, Musicland launched websites for Suncoast, Sam Goody, and Media Play.

In 2001, Best Buy purchased their then parent-company, Musicland, for $685 million.

In January 2003, Best Buy closed 20 Suncoast stores as part of a larger closing that included 90 Sam Goody stores.

Later that year in June 2003, Sun Capital Partners assumed Musicland's liabilities from Best Buy.

In January 2006, The Musicland Group filed for Chapter 11 bankruptcy in the United States Bankruptcy Court for the Southern District of New York; store closures during the bankruptcy included 80 Suncoast stores  

In late March 2006, Trans World Entertainment Corp. completed the purchase of nearly all of the assets of Musicland Holding Corporation for $104.2 million in cash and $18.1 million in assumed liabilities. TWEC retained the Suncoast name on around 170 stores after acquisition.

However, on December 26, 2009, they announced the closure of 150 Suncoast stores nationwide.

In 2022, the one in Eatontown, New Jersey closed.

As of 2023, only three full line Suncoast Motion Picture Company stores remain in Beaumont, Texas, Omaha, Nebraska and Jacksonville, North Carolina. A fourth combination FYE and Suncoast Motion picture company store remains in Beavercrek, Ohio in the The Mall at Fairfield Commons.

References

1986 establishments in Minnesota
American companies established in 1986
Companies based in Minnesota
Retail companies established in 1986
Retail companies of the United States
Companies that filed for Chapter 11 bankruptcy in 2006